A video editor is involved in video production and the post-production of film making. The video editor's responsibilities involve decisions about the selection and combining of shots into sequences, as well as the addition of accompanying sound effects and music—to ultimately create a finished movie,  television program, commercial, promo, or snipe. Video editors usually use non-linear editing software  to accomplish the task of editing. A video editor is a technically inclined individual that makes creative video editing decisions.

A video editor can also refer to a computer device controller that controls video machines to mechanically put pieces of a film together using a 9-Pin Protocol. This is also referred to as machine to machine or linear.

See also

 Audio engineer
DTE (Direct To Edit)
Film editing
Linear video editing
Non-destructive editing
Non-linear editing system (NLE)
Offline editing
Online editing
Rough cut
Video editing software

References

Types of editors